Arabella is an Italian comedy film in the English language, starring Virna Lisi, Terry-Thomas and James Fox. It was directed by Mauro Bolognini.

The film is a comic farce set in Italy, playing off the interaction between English and Italian stereotypes.

Cast 
Virna Lisi as Arabella Danesi
James Fox as Giorgio
Margaret Rutherford as Princess Ilaria
Terry-Thomas as General Sir Horace Gordon; Duke Pietro Moretti; hotel manager; insurance manager 
Giancarlo Giannini as Saverio
Milena Vukotic as Graziella
Paola Borboni as Duchess Moretti

References

External links
 
 

1967 films
1967 comedy films
Films directed by Mauro Bolognini
Films scored by Ennio Morricone
Italian comedy films
English-language Italian films
1960s English-language films
1960s Italian films